In Your Blood  is Cadaveria's third full-length album, and was released May 21, 2007 worldwide by Season of Mist. The United States and Canada release date was a day later, on May 22, 2007.

Track listing

External links 
Official Cadaveria Site
Sample Of In Your Blood

2007 albums
Cadaveria albums
Season of Mist albums